Limnatis is a genus of freshwater leeches, recorded from Europe, Africa and western Asia.  Authorities disagree whether this genus should be placed in the family Hirudinidae or Praobdellidae.

Species
Limnatis includes the following species:
 Limnatis haasi Johansson, 1927
 Limnatis nilotica (Savigny, 1822)
 Limnatis paluda (Tennent, 1859)

References

Leeches
Annelid genera